Triopha is a genus of colorful sea slugs, nudibranchs, shell-less marine gastropod mollusks in the family Polyceridae.

Species
Species within the genus Triopha include:
 Triopha catalinae Cooper, 1863
 Triopha maculata MacFarland, 1905

References

External links

 

Polyceridae